The 2014–15 Adriatic League (known as the Triglav Regionalna Liga for sponsorship reasons) was the 7th season of the Adriatic Water Polo League, with 15 teams from Croatia, Serbia, Montenegro and Slovenia participating in it.

Regular season started on October 4, 2014, and lasted until January 31, 2015 followed by playoffs of the four best placed teams, for the 2 groups.

Team information

Regular season

Standings (Group A)

Standings (Group B)

Season statistics

Top goalscorers
Updated to games played on 20 December 2014.

Adriatic League clubs in European competitions

References

External links
 Official website 
 Triglav vaterpolo liga 

2014 in water polo
2015 in water polo